Alicia García Rodríguez (born 3 January 1970) is a Spanish politician. She is a member of the People's Party. She is a current deputy in the cortes generales of the Ávila since 21 May 2019. The national electoral commission of the People's Party made public the announcement that García would attend as head of the list for Ávila ahead of the 201 general elections on March 15, 2019. She was minister of culture and tourism of the Junta of Castile and León from 27 June 2011 to 8 July 2015. She was also councilor for family and equal opportunities of the Junta of Castile and León from 27 June 2011 to 8 July 2015.

Biography
Alicia García was born in Ávila, Spain on 3 January 1970. She is married. She studied at the Complutense University of Madrid and received a bachelor of economic and business sciences from the Complutense University of Madrid. She was elected deputy of the XIII and XIV legislatures.

References 

1970 births
Living people
20th-century Spanish women politicians
21st-century Spanish women politicians
People's Party (Spain) politicians
Complutense University of Madrid alumni
People from Ávila, Spain
Spanish municipal councillors
Members of the 13th Congress of Deputies (Spain)
Members of the 14th Congress of Deputies (Spain)
Members of the 7th Cortes of Castile and León
Members of the 8th Cortes of Castile and León
Members of the 9th Cortes of Castile and León